Puzzle is a 1977 Australian television film directed by Gordon Hessler.

Premise
A woman steals gold from her second husband just before his death. She goes looking for it with her first husband, a tennis pro.

Cast
James Franciscus
Wendy Hughes
Robert Helpmann

Reception
The Sydney Morning Herald called it "a shambles, confused in concept and sloppy in script direction."

References

External links
Puzzle at BFI
Puzzle at Screen Australia
Puzzle at Peter Malone
Puzzle at IMDb

Australian television films
Films directed by Gordon Hessler